Park Pobedy (literally "Victory Park") is a station on the Moskovsko-Petrogradskaya Line of the Saint Petersburg Metro. It was opened on April 29, 1961.

The above-ground vestibule was designed by A.S. Getskin and V.P. Shuvalova, and the subterranean elements of the project were designed by architect A.K. Andreev and engineer G.A. Skobennikov.

It was among the first on the Metro to introduce a "closed-type" design where the running tunnels and tracks are isolated from the platform by thick walls, and access to trains is regulated with automatically opening and closing platform screen doors - a world first.

References
Park Pobedy page at Official St.Petersburg Metro website

Saint Petersburg Metro stations
Railway stations in Russia opened in 1961
1961 establishments in the Soviet Union
Railway stations located underground in Russia